Anta is a department located in Salta Province, Argentina.

With an area of  it borders to the north with the departments of Orán and Rivadavia, to the east with Rivadavia and Chaco Province, to the south with Santiago del Estero Province, and to the west with the departments of Metán and General Güemes and with Jujuy Province.

Towns and municipalities
 Apolinario Saravia
 El Quebrachal
 General Pizarro
 Joaquín Víctor González
 Las Lajitas
 Vinalito
 Tolloche
 Nuestra Señora de Talavera
 Macapillo
 Gaona
 Ceibalito
 Chorroarín
 Ebro
 Curva del Turco
 Santo Domingo
 Las Flores
 Las Flacas
 Luis Burela
 Coronel Mollinedo
 Palermo
 Río del Valle
 Centro 25 de Junio
 Coronel Olleros
 Piquete Cabado

References

External links 
 Departments of Salta Province website

Departments of Salta Province